The 2022 Orlando Pride season was Orlando Pride's seventh season in the National Women's Soccer League, the top division of women's soccer in the United States.

Notable events
Following the departure of interim head coach Becky Burleigh at the end of the previous season, Orlando announced the appointment of Amanda Cromwell as the team's permanent head coach on December 7, 2021. Four days earlier she had stood down as head coach of UCLA Bruins women's soccer after nine seasons in charge. Cromwell also had to divest her investment stake in 2022 expansion side Angel City FC in order to take the job. Sam Greene, Cromwell's assistant at UCLA, joined her to become first assistant coach while Cromwell's former international teammate Michelle Akers was hired as an assistant and player development coach. Seb Hines was retained from the previous coaching staff.

On December 13, 2021, the United States Soccer Federation announced the end of the allocation system ahead of the 2022 season. At the time Orlando had already traded away Ali Krieger and Ashlyn Harris, and had a deal made in principle to trade away Alex Morgan meaning Canadian goalkeeper Erin McLeod was the only federated player under contract with the Pride.

On December 16, 2021, with the addition of Angel City FC and San Diego Wave FC ahead of the 2022 NWSL season, the NWSL held the 2022 NWSL Expansion Draft. Angel City selected the playing rights of Claire Emslie off Orlando's unprotected list. Emslie had transferred out of the NWSL to English FA WSL team Everton in December 2020. San Diego did not select anyone from Orlando although the trade sending Alex Morgan to San Diego was officially announced immediately after the draft suggesting draft protection had already been agreed as part of the trade. The following day, Orlando traded Brittany Wilson and a third-round 2023 NWSL Draft pick to Angel City in exchange for a fourth-round 2023 NWSL Draft pick. General manager Ian Fleming's comments in the trade press release confirmed expansion draft protection for players currently on the Pride roster had been agreed as part of the deal.

On June 7, it was announced head coach Amanda Cromwell and assistant coach Sam Greene had been placed on administrative leave on the recommendation of the NWSL and NWSL Players Association joint investigation team following alleged "retaliation in violation of the NWSL Policy to Prevent and Eliminate Workplace Discrimination, Harassment, and Bullying." Seb Hines was promoted to interim head coach.

Roster

Staff 
.

Match results

Friendlies
As per the league schedule, NWSL teams are permitted to begin a six-week preseason camp on February 1.

National Women's Soccer League

For the third time in league history and the first time since 2014, the NWSL regular season will be played on a balanced schedule i.e. each team will play every other team twice; once at home and once away. The top six teams will qualify for the playoffs with the top two receiving a first-round bye.

Results summary

Results by round

Results

League standings

NWSL Challenge Cup 

The 2022 NWSL Challenge Cup took place between March 19 and May 7. With the format split into three groups of four teams, each team played a six-game round robin home and away series with the top team from each group progressing to the semifinals along with the highest-ranked group runner-up. Orlando were placed in the East region with Washington Spirit, North Carolina Courage and NJ/NY Gotham FC.

Standings

Squad statistics

Appearances 

Starting appearances are listed first, followed by substitute appearances after the + symbol where applicable.

|-
! colspan=12 style=background:#dcdcdc; text-align:center|Goalkeepers

|-
! colspan=12 style=background:#dcdcdc; text-align:center|Defenders

|-
! colspan=12 style=background:#dcdcdc; text-align:center|Midfielders

|-
! colspan=12 style=background:#dcdcdc; text-align:center|Forwards

|-
|colspan="12"|Players who appeared for the club but left during the season:

|}

Goalscorers

Shutouts

Disciplinary record

Transfers and loans

2022 NWSL Draft 

Draft picks are not automatically signed to the team roster. The 2022 college draft was held on December 18, 2021. Orlando made four selections.

Transfers in

Transfers out

Loans out

Preseason trialists 
Orlando Pride began preseason training on February 1, 2022. The squad included two non-roster invitees on trial with the team during preseason. Reiss was an undrafted out of the University of North Florida. Scarpa had spent the last season with KIF Örebro DFF in the Swedish Damallsvenskan. Ru Mucherera, who had signed in Finland with KuPS for the 2021 season, later joined Orlando in preseason having spent the first part on trial with San Diego Wave.

References

External links 

 

2022 National Women's Soccer League season
2022
American soccer clubs 2022 season
2022 in sports in Florida